Łagoszów Mały  is a village in the administrative district of Gmina Jerzmanowa, within Głogów County, Lower Silesian Voivodeship, in south-western Poland. 

The village has an approximate population of 250.

References

Villages in Głogów County